Itaunja is a town and a nagar panchayat in Lucknow district, in the Indian state of Uttar Pradesh. Itaunja have a railway station located at the outskirt of the nagar panchayat area near NH24.

Geography
It has an average elevation of 124 metres (406 feet).

History
Itaunja was the seat of Itaunja Estate, a Talukdari of Oudh.

References

External links
  Itaunja

Cities and towns in Lucknow district